Velocity Girl EP is the compilation of singles by Velocity Girl, released in April 1993. "Not at All" and both versions of "I Don't Care if You Go" were sung by Bridget Cross. Sarah Shannon is  lead vocal on "Forgotten Favorite" and "Why Should I Be Nice to You?".  Archie Moore does lead vocals on "Always." The song "Forgotten Favorite" was added to the soundtrack of the 1995 Alicia Silverstone movie Clueless, as well as the 2000 indie film Calling Bobcat under the title "My Forgotten Favorite."

Track listing
 "I Don't Care If You Go"
 "Always"
 "My Forgotten Favorite"
 "Why Should I Be Nice to You?"
 "Not at All"
 "I Don't Care If You Go" (acoustic)

References

External links
[ Velocity Girl 6 Song Compilation @ All-Music Guide.com]

Velocity Girl albums
1993 EPs